Michael Anthony Guider (born 20 October 1950) is an Australian paedophile, serial child molester and manslaughterer who was imprisoned on 60 charges of child sexual abuse in 1996. He received an additional sentence in 2002 for the manslaughter of 9 year-old Sydney girl Samantha Knight, who disappeared from Bondi, New South Wales in 1986. He was released from prison on 5 September, 2019, under strict conditions and an extended supervision order.

Early life
Michael Guider was born in the city of Melbourne, Victoria, Australia. He and his mother moved to Sydney in 1952. His mother had an unstable relationship with an army cook who was an alcoholic. A younger brother, Tim, was born in 1953. The two boys spent time at Melrose Boys Home because their mother was unstable and unable to look after them. Guider later told prison psychologists that he was sexually abused by his mother, and later at the boys' home.

In the 1970s, Guider was charged with various offences after setting fire to a shop owned by a woman he had had a relationship with. Guider had worked as a gardener at the Royal North Shore Hospital, and over the years had developed a keen interest in Aboriginal culture and sites around Sydney. He had earned some respect as an amateur expert on the subject and his material had been used and acknowledged in at least one published book.

Imprisonment
Guider was arrested in December 1995, after he had fondled two 7-year-old girls. One of the girls told her mother, who went to the police. In 1996, he was sentenced to 16 years' imprisonment with a non-parole period of 10 years on no less than sixty charges against eleven children. His usual modus operandi had been to babysit the children of women he knew and sedate them with the sleeping drug Temazepam. He would then molest and photograph them while they were asleep. He received a fixed term of six years and six months' imprisonment in 1999 for 11 further charges against two other children, with the judge ordering that six months of the sentence be served cumulatively.

Guider was placed in conditions of strict protection in Goulburn prison. In spite of this, he was bashed savagely on two occasions. He was admitted to the prison hospital with fractures to his right leg and hand, plus numerous abrasions. One of his ears was almost torn off. 

Taking time served in pre-sentence custody into account, Guider was eligible for parole in June 2014. On that occasion, his request for parole was denied, with the result that he still had approximately five years to serve.

Samantha Knight

Samantha Terese Knight was born Samantha Terese O'Meagher on the 25 March 1977. She lived at Manly with her parents, Tess Knight and Peter O'Meagher, but they divorced at an early stage. Knight then lived with her mother in Bronte. By 1986, they were living in a block of flats in Imperial Avenue, Bondi. She went missing on 19 August 1986. Despite an intensive campaign, in which posters of her were displayed all over New South Wales, she was never found.

Guider eventually attracted the attention of police who were investigating the disappearance of Knight, partly because of pressure from Denise Hofman (co-author of Forever Nine), who had worked with Guider on Aboriginal sites around Sydney. Freelance journalist Di Michel, who had introduced Hofman to Guider, had told Hofman how Guider had talked about Knight in a way that had sounded odd and obsessive, arousing her suspicions. Michel, however, was reluctant to go to the police because she felt she would be informing on a friend. Hofman, therefore, decided she would have to go to the police herself with this information. She duly passed the information on to a detective at Castle Hill police station.

Questioned by police, Guider initially told them that he had only met Knight a couple of times over the years, but it eventually turned out that he had molested her and two other girls at a house in Raglan Street, Manly, a number of times during 1984 and 1985. After a lengthy investigation, Guider was charged with Knight's murder on 22 February 2001. On 7 June 2001, he pleaded guilty to the manslaughter of Knight. He claimed that he had drugged her the way he had always drugged his victims, and claimed he had accidentally given her a fatal overdose, saying she regained consciousness and he then gave her a second dose because he did not want her to recognise him.

On 28 August 2002, Guider was sentenced to 17 years' imprisonment with a non-parole period of 12 years for manslaughter, to be served cumulatively with his sentence for the child sex offences. Knight's body has never been found; Guider showed no remorse, and said he could not remember what he did with her body.

Guider's statements about Knight over the years were contradictory. Initially he said he could remember nothing about what he did with her. Later he said he had buried her in Cooper Park, in the Sydney suburb of Bellevue Hill, but had dug her up later and put her in a skip at the Royal Sydney Yacht Squadron, Kirribilli, where he had worked as a gardener at the time. 

In March 2003, he told police he had buried Knight in the grounds of the Royal Sydney Yacht Squadron. On 15 May, a dig took place there but nothing was found, in spite of a police sniffer dog reacting positively to soil from the site. The dog's handler said the reaction was as positive as the dogs were capable of showing, and was surprised that nothing was found. He was as sure as he could be that a body had been there. Police believed that Guider had been telling the truth at last, but thought Knight's remains may have been removed accidentally during the construction of a car park eighteen months after Guider buried her at the site, or that Guider himself may have removed them when he heard the site was going to be dug up.

Renee Aitken
Renee Aitken was abducted from her home at Narooma, on the south coast of New South Wales, in February 1984. She was five years old. The chief suspect was Brian James Fitzpatrick, who had done time in prison for indecent assault. Fitzpatrick died in a car crash just weeks before he was due to appear at an inquest into Aitken's death.

By 2006, Hofman suspected that Guider may have been involved in Aitken's disappearance. At the time, Guider was working just two hour's drive from Narooma, in a Canberra suburb. His mug shot was identified by a member of the Aitken family and an important witness in the case. He had clippings about Aitken in his scrapbook on missing children, and these clippings came from local papers in Narooma, which implied that he had been in the area. However, police considered that there was insufficient evidence to make it worth following up on Hofman's theory. Hofman drew the attention of police to a sketch by Guider, which depicted a girl with a strong resemblance to Aitken. Police viewed the sketch but there were no further developments.

Authorship 
While in prison, Guider continued to pursue his interest in Aboriginal culture and history, writing a number of booklets on the subject. These booklets were sent to various councils in Sydney and held in various local libraries, as well as the State Library of New South Wales. He produced something like sixteen booklets, varying in length from six pages to twenty-eight. He also commenced study of archeology and attained a degree in this field.

Parole and release
Guider was eligible for parole in June 2014, when his minimum term of eighteen years and three months was up, but it was rejected by the State Parole Authority. There were several reasons for this, including "a need for structured post-release plans."

Parole was reviewed in April 2017, but denied. He was then due for review in April 2018. 

In February 2019, it was reported that Guider was legally due for release in June 2019, but the Attorney General of New South Wales was trying to keep him behind bars. The Government had applied for Guider to be incarcerated for another year. Knight's mother, Tess Knight, said she wanted Guider to be imprisoned forever, adding that he was one of the most dangerous criminals in New South Wales.

On May 27 2019, the government applied to the Supreme Court of New South Wales to have Guider kept in prison for the extra year, followed by a five-year extended supervision order. The court was due to rule on whether to place Guider on an interim detention order or an interim supervision order until a final hearing, expected to be held in August. Guider's lawyer said his client had been a model prisoner and had been allowed twenty day-leaves in the community, during which he was escorted by a chaplain. He said that if Guider were released into the community, he would stay in a halfway house attached to Long Bay Prison, and would abide by fifty-six conditions that would be "stricter than any parole."

On June 4, the Supreme Court imposed an interim detention order that would keep Guider in prison for another twenty-eight days, during which time he would be seen by a psychiatrist and a psychologist.

On 20 August, Justice Richard Button ruled that he would decide by 5 September whether Guider should be kept in prison. The Attorney-General, Mark Speakman, was seeking to keep Guider in prison for a further twelve months, with supervision for five years after his release. Guider's lawyer again argued that, if released, his client could stay in a halfway house near Long Bay Prison, with 56 conditions that would be stricter than parole. The court heard that Guider had completed fifty-five therapeutic maintenance programs while in prison. The Crown Prosecutor said Guider had declined to take drugs to reduce his sex drive because he thought they might interfere with his heart medication.

On 3 September, the judge ruled that Guider could go free, subject to a large number of restrictions. The Attorney-General was seeking advice on whether it was possible to keep Guider in longer, but he was released on 5 September, subject to a five-year supervision order. His release received saturation media coverage. Before being released, he was fitted with a Buddi Insight Smart Tag.

When released, Guider had a large tumour in his groin. He had refused to have it treated in prison because he did not trust the prison medical staff. He was expected to have the tumour examined after his release. He was also taking medication for a heart condition. While in prison, he had declined to take drugs to reduce his sex urge because he believed they would interfere with the heart medication.

After release, he was kept for some time in the abovementioned halfway house near Long Bay, and was then moved to an undisclosed location.

Reoffending

On 29 September 2022, Guider was arrested by detectives attached to the NSW Child Abuse and Sex Crimes Squad’s Extended Supervision Order Investigation Team. A random search of Guider's Fairfield Heights home had allegedly resulted in officers finding a cache of material involving child abuse and pornography material on his mobile phone. He was charged with two counts of failing to comply with an extended supervision order. He was remanded in custody and appeared at Fairfield Local Court, where the magistrate noted his terrible record and history of violence. He was due to return to court on 10 October.

Guider was subsequently sentenced to a maximum of three years imprisonment, with a non-parole period of two years and three months.

Tim Guider
Guider's younger brother, Tim Guider, was in Melrose Boys Home along with his brother until the latter left when he turned 15. After leaving Melrose himself, he had a checkered life that included a number of bank robberies and several years in prison. Later, he found success as a painter and sculptor, as well as having a son.

In 2019, when interviewed by 60 Minutes Australia, Tim Guider described Michael Guider as "The personification of evil" and called his release from prison a "Mistake".

In 2020, he published Good Brother Bad Brother, the story of the two brothers over the years, as well as the disappearance of Knight. In the book, he theorises that she was buried by his brother in a particular grave at Gore Hill Cemetery, in the Sydney suburb of St Leonards. He also analyses the circumstances around Knight's death, and concludes it could not have been accidental.

He describes his conclusions in a podcast at findsamantha.com, along with a map of the cemetery showing where he believes she was buried. At the time of writing, his belief that she was buried at Gore Hill Cemetery had not been tested by examination of the gravesite.

Gallery

Bibliography
 Guider, Tim (2020). Good Brother Bad Brother. Tim Guider.

News articles
 The Glebe, 13 July 1994
 Daily Telegraph, 29 Sep 1996
 Daily Telegraph, 1 Oct 1996
 Sydney Morning Herald, 4 Aug 1999
 Daily Telegraph, 22 Feb 2001
 Daily Telegraph, 23rd Feb 2001
 Sydney Morning Herald, 23 Feb 2001
 Daily Telegraph, 25 Feb 2001
 Daily Telegraph, 9 Apr 2002
 Daily Telegraph, 10 Apr 2002
 Daily Telegraph, 19 Apr 2002
 Daily Telegraph, 27 Apr 2002
 Sydney Morning Herald, 8 Jun 2002
 Daily Telegraph, 29 Aug 2002
 Sydney Morning Herald, 29 Aug 2002
 The Sun-Herald, 26 Nov 2006

See also
Timeline of major crimes in Australia

References

External links

 Samantha Knight at australianmissingpersonsregister.com
 Renee Aitken at australianmissingpersonsregister.com
 Tess Knight on Michael Guider
 Michael Guider Info and Photos
 Tim Guider page
 Michael Guider and Renee Aitken

1950 births
Living people
Australian people convicted of manslaughter
Australian people convicted of child sexual abuse
Criminals from Melbourne
Prisoners and detainees of New South Wales
Manslaughter trials